Bonding (stylized as BONDiNG) is an American dark comedy streaming television series that premiered on Netflix on April 24, 2019. The series stars Zoe Levin, Brendan Scannell, Micah Stock, Theo Stockman, and Nana Mensah. On January 16, 2020, the series was renewed for a second season which was released on January 27, 2021.

Bonding is reported to be loosely based on the personal experience of creator Rightor Doyle. In July 2021, the series was canceled after two seasons.

Synopsis
Tiffany "Tiff" Chester (Zoe Levin) is a psychology student moonlighting as a dominatrix. She enlists the help of Pete Devin (Brendan Scannell), her best friend from high school who is gay, to be her assistant. The semi-estranged characters reconnect in Manhattan, where Pete works as a waiter and as an aspiring stand-up comedian with stage fright. Tiff struggles as she balances her personal life with school and her job, as well as Pete's exposure to sadomasochism and BDSM and how it gradually helps him become liberated in his life.

Cast and characters

Main
 Zoe Levin as Tiffany "Tiff" Chester, a psychology grad student living in New York City. She works as dominatrix by night under the alias "Mistress May". She enlists the help of Pete to become her assistant.
 Brendan Scannell as Peter "Pete" Devin, a young gay man who becomes an assistant to Tiff. He initially chooses the alias "Carter", but is later referred to as "Master Carter".
 Micah Stock as Doug (season 2, recurring season 1), Tiff's psychology classmate, with whom she later begins a relationship
 Theo Stockman as Josh (season 2, recurring season 1), Pete's boyfriend
 Nana Mensah as Mistress Mira (season 2), Tiff's former mentor

Recurring
 Matthew Wilkas as Rolph, Tiff's German man-servant and one of her clients
 Alex Hurt as Frank, Pete's roommate
 Gabrielle Ryan as Portia, Frank's girlfriend
 Alysha Umphress as Murphy, a stand-up comedian and Pete's friend
 Kevin Kane as Professor Charles (season 1), Tiff's psychology professor
 Stephanie Styles as Kate (season 1)
 Charles Gould as Fred, one of Tiff's clients

Guest
 Jade Elysan as Cat Dom (season 1)
 Stephen Reich as Trevor (season 1)
 D'Arcy Carden as Daphne (season 1)
 Amy Bettina as Chelsea
 Eric Berryman as Andy (season 1), Daphne's husband
 Kevin Kilner as MJP (season 2)
 Nico Evers-Swindell as Martin (season 2)

Episodes

Season 1 (2019)

Season 2 (2021)

Production

Development
On December 14, 2018, Netflix announced it had picked up the series for a seven-episode first season. The series is created by Rightor Doyle, who is credited as an executive producer, alongside Dara Gordon, Jacob Perlin, Nina Soriano, Tom Schembri and David Sigurani. Production companies involved with the series include Blackpills and Anonymous Content. On January 16, 2020, Netflix renewed the series for a second season consisting of eight-episodes. On July 2, 2021, Netflix canceled the series after two seasons.

Casting
After Netflix acquired the series, it was confirmed that Zoe Levin and Brendan Scannell would star in the series.

Release
On April 22, 2019, Netflix released the official trailer for the series.

Reception
On review aggregator Rotten Tomatoes, the first season holds an approval rating of 71% with an average rating of 6.95/10 based on 14 reviews. The website's consensus reads: "Though Bondings juicy spin on friendship and sexuality boldly treads into uncharted territory, the show's writing too often teeters uncomfortably between bewitchingly funny and bewilderingly underwhelming to make it a truly satisfying experience."

On Rotten Tomatoes, the second season has three positive reviews and no negative reviews. Daniel Hart of Ready Steady Cut described the second season as "more fruitful and more emotional" and wrote: "while the previous instalment gave it a larger dose of comedy, there's more respect for the community's work in this season; there's an understanding that the world of dominatrix fulfils the pleasure of many that it is not just a space for whips and leather". Jess Joho of Mashable said that the second season "stands out for focusing far less on the leather of it all, and far more on the underlying emotional connection, vulnerability, communication, and boundary-setting that can make ethical BDSM an incredible vehicle for deepening relationships".

Accolades

Controversy
After the release of the first season, the series suffered several criticisms by the BDSM community for containing a high level of inaccuracy. According to BDSM workers, the series' humor revolves around mistaken stereotypes and does not accurately portray the reality of BDSM.

BDSM experts characterize Tiff as cold and aggressive, not knowing how to separate the dominatrix personality from the everyday personality. In addition, the series attempts to use a history of sexual trauma to justify Tiff's preference for domination fetishes, a view that is considered clichéd and misguided about sex workers. The lack of negotiation and consent in several scenes in the first season and the collar with "Ring of O", a symbol of BDSM submission, being used by the protagonist are also other problems pointed out by BDSM professionals.

Shortly after the first season's release, one of the series' creators, Rightor Doyle, responded to negative criticism by stating that he would listen to the BDSM community to fix the inaccuracies shown in the series so far. With that, they hired as consultant Olivia Troy, a writer who has worked with BDSM for 15 years, to assist them in the script for the second season. This caused most of the negative points pointed out in the first season to be corrected, making the series closer to the reality of BDSM.

According to Troy, the lack of consent, communication and connection between dominatrix and submissive is one of the main mistakes made by the media when BDSM is addressed. Despite the evolution of the second season, Troy also states that there are still some moments that are not necessarily realistic because the theme must fit into the style and script of the show.

Actress Zoe Levin said she initially accepted the role not knowing how the work of a dominatrix really is. After seeing all the negative reviews the series received in the first season, she went with consultant Olivia Troy to BDSM studios to learn about the equipment, philosophy and ethical principles adopted by the BDSM community. When asked what message the second season brings to the audience, Levin said "the hope is that they see BDSM and sex work and bondage in a different light than they normally do. Because, what we have seen in TV and film is the very stereotypical version of what we only think BDSM is."

References

External links
 
 

2010s American black comedy television series
2010s American comedy-drama television series
2010s American LGBT-related comedy television series
2010s American LGBT-related drama television series
2010s American sex comedy television series
2020s American black comedy television series
2020s American comedy-drama television series
2020s American LGBT-related comedy television series
2020s American LGBT-related drama television series
2020s American sex comedy television series
2019 American television series debuts
2021 American television series endings
BDSM-related mass media
Gay-related television shows
English-language Netflix original programming
Television series by Anonymous Content
Television shows set in New York City